This is a list of some of the active law firms online in Uganda.  It includes firms based in Uganda alone, and regional law firms that have a significant Ugandan practice.  All have offices in Kampala.

Ugandan firms

Uganda-headquartered firms include
This is a list of notable Ugandan-based law firms

Bwire, Kalinaki & Co. Advocates
Byenkya, Kihika & Company Advocates
Katende Ssempebwa & Company Advocates
Sebalu & Lule Advocates
A.F. Mpanga Advocates
Kampala Associated Advocates
Kateera & Kagumire Advocates
Kasirye Byaruhanga and Company Advocates
ENSafrica
Kigozi Ssempala Mukasa Obonyo Advocates
Ligomarc Advocates

International law firms in Uganda
International law firms that have had offices in Uganda include:
 Bowman Gilfillan
 DLA Piper
 Dentons

See also
 Law Development Centre
 Uganda Law Society
 Legal practice in Uganda
 Legal education in Uganda

References

External links
  Laws of Uganda
  Law Council
  Law Firms, Lawyers in Uganda by City
  Legal market overview

Uganda
law firms